Dimasalang Street  is a major road between the districts of Sampaloc and Santa Cruz in the Manila, the capital city of the Philippines. Running  in the north–south direction, it connects Lacson Avenue and Laon Laan Street in the south to Blumentritt Road, near the city's border with Quezon City, in the north. It also crosses over the Philippine National Railway tracks and below NLEX Connector at Dimasalang Bridge. It is named after Dimasalang, one of the pen names of the Philippine national hero José Rizal.

The entire route is designated as National Route 162 (N162) of the Philippine highway network and a component of Radial Road 8 of the Metro Manila arterial road system.

Landmarks
 Dangwa Bus Terminal
 Dangwa flower market
 Hospital of the Infant Jesus

References

Streets in Manila